Alexander Vilenkin (born 13 May 1949) is the Leonard Jane Holmes Bernstein Professor of Evolutionary Science and Director of the Institute of Cosmology at Tufts University. A theoretical physicist who has been working in the field of cosmology for 25 years, Vilenkin has written over 260 publications.

Biography
As an undergraduate studying physics at the University of Kharkiv, Vilenkin turned down a job offer from the KGB, causing him to be blacklisted from pursuing a graduate degree. Then he was drafted into a building brigade and later worked at the state zoo as a night watchman while conducting physics research in his spare time.

In 1976, Vilenkin immigrated to the United States as a Jewish refugee, obtaining his Ph.D. at Buffalo. His work has been featured in numerous newspaper and magazine articles in the United States, Europe, Soviet Union, and Japan, and in many popular books.

Work
In 1982, Paul Steinhardt presented the first model of eternal inflation, Vilenkin showed that eternal inflation is generic. Furthermore, working with Arvind Borde and Alan Guth, he developed the Borde–Guth–Vilenkin theorem, showing that a period of inflation must have a beginning and that a period of time must precede it. This represents a problem for the theory of inflation because, without a theory to explain conditions before inflation, it is not possible to determine how likely it is for inflation to have occurred.

He also further developed Edward P. Tryon's idea of quantum creation of the universe from a quantum vacuum.

He was elected a Fellow of the American Physical Society in 1989 "for pioneering research in the application of particle physics to cosmology, and in particular for seminal contributions in the areas of cosmic strings and quantum cosmology".

Books
Many Worlds in One: The Search for Other Universes A. Vilenkin (Macmillan, July 2006)
Cosmic Strings and Other Topological Defects by A. Vilenkin, E. P. S. Shellard (paperback – July 31, 2000)

References

External links
 Publications of Alexander Vilenkin @ INSPIRE-HEP
Interview with Tufts cosmologist Alex Vilenkin on his new book, "Many Worlds in One: The Search for Other Universes" on the podcast and public radio interview program ThoughtCast.
Inflationary spacetimes are not past-complete
 Interview with Vilenkin on "New Books in Astronomy"
 Lecture by Vilenkin on "Proving the Universe Had a Beginning"

1949 births
Living people
20th-century Ukrainian physicists
21st-century American physicists
Soviet emigrants to the United States
National University of Kharkiv alumni
University at Buffalo alumni
Tufts University faculty
American cosmologists
Fellows of the American Physical Society